This is a partial list of transitional fossils (fossil remains of groups that exhibit both "primitive" and derived traits). The fossils are listed in series, showing the transition from one group to another, representing significant steps in the evolution of major features in various lineages. These changes often represent major changes in morphology and anatomy, related to mode of life, like the acquisition of feathered wings for an aerial lifestyle in birds, or limbs in the fish/tetrapod transition onto land.

Darwin noted that transitional forms could be considered common ancestors, direct ancestors or collateral ancestors of living or extinct groups, but believed that finding actual common or direct ancestors linking different groups was unlikely. Collateral ancestors are relatives like cousins in genealogies in which they are not in your direct line of descent but do share a common ancestor (in this case it is a grandparent). This kind of thinking can be extended to groups of life. For instance, the well-known Archaeopteryx is a transitional form between non-avian dinosaurs and birds, but it is not the most recent common ancestor of all birds nor is it a direct ancestor of any species of bird alive today. Rather, it is considered an extinct close evolutionary "cousin" to the direct ancestors. This may not always be the case, though, as some fossil species are proposed to be directly ancestral to others, like how Australopithecus anamensis is most likely to be ancestral to Australopithecus afarensis.

Nautiloids to ammonoids

Cephalopods

Evolution of insects

Evolution of spiders

Invertebrates to fish

Chondrichthyes

Bony fish

Fish to tetrapods

Amphibians to amniotes

Turtles

From lizards to snakes

Lizards

Pterosaurs

Archosaurs to dinosaurs

Dinosauria

Dinosaurs to birds

Bird evolution

Non-mammalian synapsids to mammals

Evolution of mammals

Early artiodactyls to whales

Evolution of sirenians

Evolution of pinnipeds

Evolution of the horse

Human evolution
List of human evolution fossils

See also

 Chimpanzee genome project#Genes of the chromosome 2 fusion site
 List of fossil sites (with link directory)
 List of human evolution fossils
 Transitional fossil

References

External links
 Vuletic.com, Section V: Paleontology – Transitional fossils between every animal group
 Palaeos.com, Palaeos vertebrates starting with lobe-finned fish (very comprehensive)
 Talk.origins.org, FAQ: Transitional vertebrate fossils
 (A few) transitional fossils

Lists of prehistoric animals